Domblans is a commune in the Jura department in Bourgogne-Franche-Comté in eastern France. On 1 January 2019, the former commune Bréry was merged into Domblans.

Population

Sights
 Château de la Muyre, castle originating from the 15th century.

See also 
 Communes of the Jura department

References 

Communes of Jura (department)